Pachyiulus speciosus is a species of millipede from Julidae family that is endemic to Greece.

References

Julida
Animals described in 1900
Endemic fauna of Greece
Millipedes of Europe